Randy Bennett (November 11, 1963  – April 27, 2015) was a Canadian swimming coach who primarily operated out of the West Coast of Canada during his career. From 2009 until his death in 2015 he was the coach of the Canadian National Swim Team including during the 2012 Summer Olympics where his protege Ryan Cochrane won his second Olympic medal. Over the years he has coached several prominent Canadian athletics including World and Olympic medalists such as the aforementioned Cochrane, Julia Wilkinson, Richard Weinberger, Eric Hedlin, Hilary Caldwell, Marianne Limpert, Blake Worsley and many others.

Coaching achievements

 Coach, 1999 / 2006 / 2010 Pan Pacific Championship Coach
 Coach, 1998 & 2006 Commonwealth Games
 Coach, 2000 & 2008 Olympic Games
 Coach, 2001 & 2007 FINA World Championships
 Coach, 2003 Pan American Games
 Head Coach, 2009 FINA World Championships
 Head Coach, 2010 Commonwealth Games
 Head Coach, 2011 FINA World Championships
 Head Coach, 2012 Olympic Games
 Head Coach, 2013 FINA World Championships

Club positions
 1982–1985 Assistant Coach, Fort McMurray Swim Club – Fort McMurray, AB
 1985–1989 Assistant Coach, Edmonton Keyano Swim Club – Edmonton, AB
 1989–1993 Head Coach, Port Alberni Tsunami Swim Team – Port Alberni, BC
 1993–2002 Assistant Head Coach, UBC Dolphins – Vancouver, BC
 2002–2008 Head Coach, Victoria Amateur Swim Club – Victoria, BC
 2002–2012 Director, Island Swimming Association – Victoria, BC

Coaching honours
 Swimming Canada Coach of the Year Award (male swimmer) – 2008, 2009, 2010, 2011, 2012, 2013, 2014
 Swimming Canada Coach of the Year Award (female swimmer) – 2013
 Aquatics Federation of Canada - Coach of the Year – 2011
 Chevrolet High Performance Coach Grant Recipient – 2010
 Jeno Tihanyi Bursary – 2008
 Petro-Canada coaching Excellence Award Winner – 2008, 2007, 2008, 2009 ,2010, 2011, 2012, 2013, 2014
 Swimming Canada Distance Freestyler of the Year – Ryan Cochrane 2007, 2008, 2009, 2010, 2011, 2012, 2013, 2014
 Male Junior Swimmer of the Year – Ryan Cochrane 2006, 2007
 British Columbia Swim Coaches Association BCSCA - Junior Coach of the Year – 2003, 2005
 British Columbia Swim Coaches Association BCSCA -  International Coach of the year – 2008, 2010, 2011, 2012, 2013, 2014
 British Columbia Swim Coaches Association BCSCA - National Coach of the Year - 2013, 2014, 2015
 British Columbia Swim Coaches Association BCSCA - Open Water Coach - 2013
 Sport BC Male Coach of the Year – 2016
 Governor General Award – 2012
 Greater Victoria Sports Hall of Fame Induction – Randy Bennett
BC Swimming Hall of Fame - 2018

References

External links
 Randy Bennett at Swimming Canada
 Randy Bennett: Swim coach remembered as selfless motivator. The Globe & Mail
 Coaching Association of Canada – Tip of the Week
 Times Colonist Obituary
 Olympic.ca obituary
 Swim BC / Swimming Canada Memorial

1960s births
2015 deaths
Canadian swimming coaches
College swimming coaches in the United States
Sportspeople from Victoria, British Columbia
Deaths from cancer in British Columbia